Kopka can refer to:

People
 Angeline Kopka (1916–2016), American politician
 Bogusław Tadeusz Kopka (born 1969), Polish historian and professor
 Łukasz Kopka (born 1996), Polish footballer
 Raymond Kopka (born 1971), British weightlifter

Other
 Kopka language
 Kopka River

See also
 Kapka (disambiguation)